Begonia incarnata is a species of plant in the family Begoniaceae, native to Brazil. It produces small hairy pink flowers. As it does not tolerate temperatures below , in temperate regions it must be grown under glass.

This plant has gained the Royal Horticultural Society's Award of Garden Merit under the synonym Begonia metallica.

References

External links

incarnata
Flora of Brazil
Plants described in 1829